Balychi is a village in Yavoriv Raion, Lviv Oblast in western Ukraine. It belongs to Shehyni rural hromada, one of the hromadas of Ukraine. Balychi has 987 inhabitants. It is named after an aristocratic Balicki family who acquired the land from Jan Czech in 1400.

Until 18 July 2020, Balychi belonged to Mostyska Raion. The raion was abolished in July 2020 as part of the administrative reform of Ukraine, which reduced the number of raions of Lviv Oblast to seven. The area of Mostyska Raion was merged into Yavoriv Raion.

References

External links
Balice, dawniej Balicze, [w:] Słownik geograficzny Królestwa Polskiego, t. I: Aa – Dereneczna, Warszawa 1880, s. 87

Villages in Yavoriv Raion